Clinical Associates are a category of health professional found in South Africa. They assess patients, make diagnoses, prescribe treatment and perform minor surgery under the supervision of a physician.

Registration with the Medical and Dentists Board requires a Bachelor of Clinical Medical Practice degree  - a three-year program offered at the Walter Sisulu University since January 2008  and now also offered at the University of Witwatersrand, University of Pretoria and the University of Limpopo (Medunsa Campus).

Similar health workers are called clinical officers in other parts of Africa, physician assistants in the US and feldshers in parts of the former Soviet Union - all grouped under “paramedical practitioners” in the International Standard Classification of Occupations, 2008 revision.

See also
Health care providers
Allied health professions
Clinical officers
Assistant Medical Officers
Health Extension Officers
Bachelor of Clinical Medicine and Community Health
Bachelor of Clinical Medical Practice

References

External links
Professional Association of Clinical Associates in South Africa
Clinical Associates South Africa

Health care occupations